The 33rd Arizona State Legislature, consisting of the Arizona State Senate and the Arizona House of Representatives, was constituted in Phoenix from January 1, 1977, to December 31, 1978. The legislature met during the terms of three Arizona Governors.  When it was constituted, Raúl Héctor Castro still had two years remaining on his only term in office as Governor of Arizona.  When Castro left the office to become Ambassador to Argentina in October 1977, he was succeeded by Wesley Bolin, Arizona's Secretary of State.  Arizona's constitution mandates that the Secretary of State is first in line of succession to the office of Governor. However, Bolin died in office five months later, on March 4, 1978, and was succeeded by Bruce Babbitt, who was then the Attorney General.  Bolin was not succeeded by his replacement, Rose Mofford, because she had been appointed, not elected to the office. Succession fell to the next in line, Babbitt. Both the Senate and the House membership remained constant at 30 and 60, respectively. The Republicans made inroads into the Democrat lead in the Senate, picking up two seats, although the Democrats maintained a 16–14 edge in the upper house. In the lower chamber, the Republicans increased their majority by 5 seats, giving them a 38–22 margin.

Sessions
The Legislature met for two regular sessions at the State Capitol in Phoenix. The first opened on January 10, 1977, and the two houses adjourned separately.  The Senate adjourned on May 27, 1977, at 11:59 pm, while the House adjourned two minutes later, at 12:01 am on May 28. The Second Regular Session convened on January 9, 1978, and adjourned sine die on June 4.

There were two special sessions.  The first convened on June 29, 1978, and adjourned sine die later that same day, while the second convened on October 19, 1978, and also adjourned later that same day.

State Senate

Members

The asterisk (*) denotes members of the previous Legislature who continued in office as members of this Legislature.

House of Representatives

Members 
The asterisk (*) denotes members of the previous Legislature who continued in office as members of this Legislature.

The ** denotes that Skelly was a member of the prior legislature, but from district 25.

References

Arizona legislative sessions
1977 in Arizona
1978 in Arizona
1977 U.S. legislative sessions
1978 U.S. legislative sessions